Euforia is the twenty-first studio album by La Mafia released on September 1, 1998.

Track listing

References

1998 albums
La Mafia albums
Spanish-language albums